Aquaphor is a brand of over-the-counter (OTC) skin care ointments manufactured by Beiersdorf Inc., an affiliate of Beiersdorf AG. Aquaphor is offered in four product ranges:  There are two skin protectant ointments. Aquaphor Original Ointment, used as a compounding agent  and Aquaphor Advanced Therapy Healing Ointment, sold in mass retail outlets. The other product ranges include: Aquaphor Lip Repair and Lip Repair + Protect SPF 30, and Aquaphor Baby.

Aquaphor has been  available in the United States market for over 90 years. In accordance with the Food and Drug Administration's OTC Skin Protectant Monograph  Aquaphor, containing 41 percent petrolatum (or petroleum jelly), the active ingredient, temporarily protects minor cuts, scrapes, and burns; protects and helps relieve chapped or cracked skin and lips; helps protect from the drying effects of wind and cold weather.

Aquaphor is used and recommended  by health care professionals for minor post-operative wounds or defects.

History 

1925: Aquaphor was developed in the Beiersdorf Inc laboratories in the USA. It was trademarked that year by Herman A. Metz, president of Beiersdorf Inc at that time.

1929: Beiersdorf sold Aquaphor’s trade marks to Duke Laboratories in order to manufacture products in the country.

1936: Aquaphor’s first product offering was sold to doctors, pharmacists and hospitals in 5 lb. containers.

1960: Aquaphor production was discontinued during World War II and restarted by Duke Laboratiories in 1960. One lb cans and 2 oz tubes were sold to medical professionals.

1973: Beiersdorf repurchased all trademarks from Duke Laboratories.

1982: Aquaphor tube was introduced and directly sold to consumers for the first time.

1991: A new formulation Aquaphor Advanced Therapy Healing Ointment was launched, an addition to the Aquaphor Original Ointment.

2003: Aquaphor Baby Healing Ointment & Gentle Wash were  introduced.

2011: Aquaphor Lip Repair was introduced

2012: Aquaphor Lip Repair + Protect SPF 30 was launched and
Aquaphor is launched globally by Beiersdorf affiliates in 25 other countries.

2013: Aquaphor achieved the Good Housekeeping Seal.

Properties and ingredients 
In a study funded by Aquaphor's parent company, it was found that their "Healing Ointment" product was associated with (but did not cause) decreased redness around the wound but did not in any way perform better than other products clinically.

Aquaphor is not comedogenic and does not contain any fragrances, preservatives, or dyes.

Unlike Vaseline (100% petrolatum), which is occlusive, Aquaphor (41% petrolatum) claims to form a semi-occlusive barrier on the skin. If correct, this in theory should enable the transmission of water and oxygen, which is important for wound healing and the formation of a protective moist healing environment. However, no studies have been conducted using this brand to test these healing claims.

Key ingredients 
Petrolatum

An active ingredient and OTC skin protectant, petrolatum forms an occlusive barrier on the skin and helps retain moisture.

Mineral oil

A colorless, odorless, light oil, commonly obtained as a highly refined derivative of crude oil.  Baby oil is a perfumed variety of mineral oil.

Ceresin

A wax derived from the purification of the natural wax ozokerite.

Lanolin alcohol

A subfraction of lanolin (wool wax), a mixture of hydrocarbons that imparts emulsifying properties and provides emollient (skin smoothing) properties. Lanolin alcohol is composed of cholesterol, other sterols, and free fatty acids. Moisturizers containing Cholesterol and fatty acid mixtures have been shown to provide skin benefits. Since this ingredient is sourced from wool from animals, this product is not suitable for vegans.

Glycerin

A moisturizing factor and humectant that attracts and binds moisture in the stratum corneum (outer-most layer of epidermis), helping to keep it hydrated. It is commonly used as a moisturizing agent in lotions, creams, and cosmetics. Most glycerin used in products in the U.S. comes from animals. If it is natural glycerin, it will typically be labeled ‘plant derived’.

Panthenol

Also known as pro- Vitamin B5, when applied topically, has humectant properties and conditions the skin.

Bisabolol

Derived from the Chamomile plant, bisabolol can have anti-inflammatory, anti-pruritic and healing effects in-vivo.

See also

References

External links 
 

Beiersdorf brands
Personal care brands